Cyclosiloxanes are a class of silicone material. They are volatile and often used as a solvent. The three main commercial varies are octamethylcyclotetrasiloxane (D4), decamethylcyclopentasiloxane (D5) and dodecamethylcyclohexasiloxane (D6). They evaporate and degrade in air under sunlight.

Octamethylcyclotetrasiloxane (D4)

The octamethylcyclotetrasiloxane silicone liquid has no odor and consists of four repeating units of silicon (Si) and oxygen (O) atoms in a closed loop giving it a circular structure. Each silicon atom has two methyl groups attached (CH3).

Decamethylcyclopentasiloxane (D5)

Decamethylcyclopentasiloxane silicone liquid has no odor and consists of five repeating units of silicon (Si) and oxygen (O) atoms in a closed loop giving it a circular structure. Each silicon atom has two methyl groups attached (CH3). Typically it is used as an ingredient in antiperspirant, skin cream, sun protection lotion and make-up. With a low surface tension of 18 mN/m this material has good spreading properties.

Dodecamethylcyclohexasiloxane (D6)
The dodecamethylcyclohexasiloxane silicone liquid has no odor and consists of six repeating units of silicon (Si) and oxygen (O) atoms in a closed loop giving it a circular structure. Each silicon atom has two methyl groups attached (CH3).

References

Silicones
Chemistry
Solvents
Materials